Sir Terence Ernest Manitou Frost RA (13 October 1915 – 1 September 2003) was a British abstract artist, who worked in Newlyn, Cornwall. Frost was renowned for his use of the Cornish light, colour and shape to start a new art movement in England.  He became a leading exponent of abstract art and a recognised figure of the British art establishment.

Career
Born in Leamington Spa, Warwickshire, in 1915, he did not become an artist until he was in his 30s. He left school aged fourteen and went to work at Curry's cycle shop and then at Armstrong Whitworth in Coventry.  During World War II, he served in France, the Middle East and Greece, before joining the commandos.  Whilst serving with the commandos in Crete in June 1941 he was captured and sent to various prisoner of war camps. As a prisoner of war at Stalag 383 in Bavaria, he met Adrian Heath who encouraged him to paint.  Commenting later he described these years as a 'tremendous spiritual experience, a more aware or heightened perception during starvation'.

As soon as war was over he went to Birmingham College of Art, where he met Barrie Cook. However Frost quickly assumed that the action was elsewhere.  At first attended Camberwell School of Art under Leonard Fuller.  The following year, 1946 he removed for a year out to St. Ives School of Painting where his first solo exhibition was held in 1947 at G.B. Downing's bookshop, before returning to London and that autumn the Camberwell School of Art under Victor Pasmore, Ben Nicholson and William Coldstream bringing him to paint his first abstract work in 1949.  For three years he exhibited with the St Ives Society of Artists until in 1950 he was elected a member of the Penwith Society; he maintained a permanent connection with the Newlyn school.  Already settled in the town by 1951 he worked as an assistant to the sculptor Barbara Hepworth.  He was joined there by Roger Hilton, where they began a collaboration in collage and construction techniques.

His first exhibition was the Leicester Galleries in the heart of London's West End.  Frost's academic career included teaching at Bath Academy of Art, the Coventry College of Art and was appointed on the recommendation of Herbert Read as the Gregory Fellow on Painting (1954-1956) at the University of Leeds. There he befriended the painter Stass Paraskos, who would later invite Frost to spend time working and teaching in Cyprus at the Cyprus College of Art.

In 1958 while still living in Leeds and teaching at Leeds School of Art he joined the London Group.  He moved to St Ives, and then in 1963 to Banbury, where his house at 2 Old Parr Street now sports an Oxfordshire Blue Plaque.

Later he became Artist in Residence and Professor of Painting at the Department of Fine Art of the University of Reading.

In the 1960s, Frost was represented by the Bertha Schaefer Gallery in New York, NY.

In 1992 he was elected a Royal Academician and he was knighted in 1998. A retrospective of his work was held in 2000.

Personal life
He married Kathleen Clarke in 1945. They had five sons and one daughter.  Two of his sons, Adrian and Anthony, also became artists, while a third son, Stephen, is a comedian and actor.  His grandson Luke Frost (son of Anthony) is also an artist.

Selected works 
The following list is not comprehensive but includes paintings, screenprints, sikcreens, etchings, aquatints, woodcuts and collages.

 Movement: Green, Black and White (1951-2) Scottish National Gallery of Modern Art
 Blue Moon (1952)
 Double Quay (1952) 
 Boat shapes (1954)
 Khaki and Lemon (1956) 
 Red and Black linear (1967-8)
 Lace I (Trial proof) (1968)
 Red and Black Solid (1968)
 Red and Black on Green (1968)
 Red and Black on Blue (1968)
 Red and Black on Purple (1969)
 Ochre, Red, Blue (1969)
 Red, Blue, Orange on Yellow (1969)
 Blues (1969)
 Orange Dusk (1970)
 Stacked on Side (1970)
 Red and Black on the Side (1970) 
 Moonship (1972)
 Red, Blue, Green (1972)
 Ice Blue (1972)
 Alhambra (1972)
 Blue, Brown, Black (1981) The Country House Gallery, Burnley
 Blue, Brown, Black (1981) Ian Starr, Manchester
 Suspended Forms Red Yellow & Blue (1986)
 Variations (1989)
 The Old Lizard (1989)
 Pause of the Clock (1989)
 Colour on the Side (1989)
 Moon Rising (1989)
 The Spinster at Mass (1989)
 Tree, Tree (1989)
 Lorca Sun (1991) 
 Newlyn Rhythm (1995) 
 Spring Spiral screen print, Flowers Editions
 Arizona (1996) Flowers Editions, London
 Spring Spiral (1996)
 Black Mon and Ochre (1997) The Country House Gallery, Burnley
 Canadian Pacific Blue (1997)
 Canadian Pacific Yellow (1997)
 Black Orchard (1997) Flowers Editions
 Colour Rhythm Newlyn (1997) 
 Madron Blue Suite I (1997)
 Madron Blue Suite II (1997) 
 Madron Blue Suite III (1997)  
 Sundrops lithograph (1997)
 Swing Red Newlyn (1998)
 Timberaine A woodcut (2000) 
 Camberwell Green (2001) 
 Small Yellow Timberain (2001) 
 Sunbow (2002) Askew Art, Henley-on-Thames
 3 Stripes for Red (2002) AE Art, Warwick.
 Black Circle (2002)
 Blue Brad  AE Art 
 Long Red Yellow and Black (2002) 
 Blue, Black, Red and Vertical Rhythm (2002) The Country House Gallery
 A Rare Portfolio - SS (April 2003) AE Art, Warwick
 Blue Love Tree (2003)
 Laced Sun from SS set (2003)
 Slumber Black (2003) 
 Sun Tree silk screen (2003)
 Three Graces etching, (2003)
 Vertical Lines screenprint (2003)
 Two Models etching (2003)
 Lizard Black II (2003)
 Carlyon Sunshine silk screen print (2003)
 Sun and Boats (2003)

See also

 List of St. Ives artists

References

 Mary Chamot, Dennis Farr & Martin Butlin, The Modern British Paintings, Drawings and Sculpture, London 1964, I
 Terry Frost: Paintings, drawings and collages, Art Council catalogue 1976–7.
 Dominic Kemp, The Prints of Sir Terry Frost RA, (Lund Humphries, 2010)
 Frances Spalding, 20th Century Painters and Sculptors Dictionary of British Art Vol.6 (Antique Collectors Club, 1990)

External links
 
 
 
 
 
 

1915 births
2003 deaths
20th-century English painters
English male painters
21st-century English painters
21st-century English male artists
St Ives artists
Abstract expressionist artists
Modern painters
Royal Academicians
Academics of the University of Reading
Academics of the University of Leeds
Alumni of Camberwell College of Arts
British Army personnel of World War II
British World War II prisoners of war
People from Leamington Spa
People from Newlyn
Knights Bachelor
Academics of Coventry University
British Army Commandos soldiers
World War II prisoners of war held by Germany
20th-century English male artists
Military personnel from Warwickshire